Hydrodictyaceae is a family of green algae in the order Sphaeropleales.

Genera 
 Euastropsis
 Helierella
 Hydrodictyon
 Lacunastrum
 Monactinus
 Parapediastrum
 Pediastrum
 Pseudopediastrum
 Sorastrum
 Sphaerastrum
 Stauridium
 Tetraedroides
 Tetraedron
 Tetrapedia

References

Chlorophyceae families
Sphaeropleales